Keoikantse Motsepe (born 24 November 1989) is a South African dancer. His dancing styles are Latin and Ballroom. He is known for being the first black professional dancer on the ABC show Dancing with the Stars.

Life and career 
Motsepe started his career at 11 years of age by entering into in a competitive dance scene representing his country. In 2012 Motsepe joined the cast of Burn the Floor. In 2014 it was announced that Motsepe would join the cast of pro dancers on Dancing with the Stars.

Dancing with the Stars
In season 19, Motsepe was paired up with Olympic athlete Lolo Jones. They were eliminated during the first week of competition, finishing in 13th place.

In season 20,  Motsepe was paired up with model Charlotte McKinney. They were eliminated in the third week of competition, finishing in 11th place.

For season 21, he paired with Grammy Award-winning singer Chaka Khan. They were the first couple eliminated on the second week of competition, finishing in 13th place.

For season 22, he was partnered with Full House and Fuller House actress Jodie Sweetin. The couple was eliminated in the eighth week of competition, despite being at the top of the leader board that week. They placed 6th overall. In a surprise challenge, judge Bruno Tonioli worked with Sweetin and eventual-winner Nyle DiMarco and their professional partners.  During the sequence, the two celebrities swapped partners, seeing DiMarco and Motsepe dance the tango in ballroom hold, with both men shirtless, and Motsepe lift and twirl DiMarco.  This was the first same-sex dancing included in the show's franchise world-wide.

He returned to season 23 but as a troupe member.

For season 24, he returned as a pro dancer and was partnered with actress & comedian Charo. They were eliminated in the third week of competition, finishing in 11th place.

Motsepe returned for season 25 and is paired with Shark Tank panelist, Barbara Corcoran. They were the first couple eliminated on the second week of competition, finishing in 13th place.

For season 26, he was partnered with former Olympic softball pitcher Jennie Finch Daigle. They were eliminated on the third week of competition and finished in 4th place, tying with Chris Mazdzer and Mirai Nagasu and partners Witney Carson and Alan Bersten.

For season 27, he was paired with Harry Potter actress Evanna Lynch. The couple made it to the finals where they finished in 3rd place, marking Motsepe's best so far and also his first time in the finale.

Motsepe appeared in season 28 as a pro dancer, but was not paired with a celebrity. He returned to compete again on season 29 where he is partnered with actress Anne Heche. They were eliminated in the fourth week of competition and finished in 13th place.

With Lolo Jones
Average: 22.0; placed 13th

With Charlotte McKinney
Average: 23.3; placed 11th

With Chaka Khan
Average: 14.0; placed 13th

With Jodie Sweetin
Average: 24.5; placed 6th

1 Score given by guest judge Zendaya.2 For this week only, as part of "America's Switch Up", Sweetin performed with Valentin Chmerkovskiy instead of Motsepe. Motsepe performed with Kim Fields.3 Score given by guest judge Maksim Chmerkovskiy.4 Due to Tonioli being the judge coaching Sweetin's team during the team-up dance, the viewers scored the dance in his place with the averaged score being counted alongside the remaining judges.

With Charo
Average: 23.3; placed 11th

With Barbara Corcoran
Average: 15.5; placed 13th

With Jennie Finch Daigle
Average: 22.0; placed 4th

1 Score given by guest judge Rashad Jennings.  2 Score given by guest judge David Ross.

With Evanna Lynch
Average: 26.7; placed 3rd

With Anne Heche
Average: 18 ; placed 13th

References

South African ballroom dancers
South African male dancers
Living people
1989 births
South African expatriates in the United States
People from Pretoria